Boogan is a rural locality in the Cassowary Coast Region, Queensland, Australia. In the  Boogan had a population of 119 people.

Geography 
The Bruce Highway forms part of the eastern boundary of the locality, while the South Johnstone River forms the north-western boundary. The land is relatively flat and low-lying ( above sea level) and is predominantly used for cropping, particularly sugarcane. The North Coast railway line passes from south to north through the middle of the locality and there is a cane tramway to transport harvested sugarcane to the local sugar mills.

History 
The locality takes its name from the Boogan railway station named by the Queensland Railways Department on 12 September 1920. Boogan is an Aboriginal word meaning either forest country or dog.

Boogan State School opened on 15 July 1929 and closed on 14 December 1979.

In the  Boogan had a population of 119 people.

References

External links 

Cassowary Coast Region
Localities in Queensland